The Toledo Troopers were a professional women's American football team based in Toledo, Ohio. 

The Troopers began play in 1971 as a member of the Women's Professional Football League (WPFL), and later played in the National Women's Football League (NWFL). The franchise folded before the 1980 season, after it was put up for sale by the owner.

The Troopers hold the record for most championship titles in women’s football history after winning seven "World Championships" (1971 through 1977). In 1983, the Troopers were recognized as the "winningest team in professional football history" at the Pro Football Hall of Fame, and they were also the first team to be inducted into Women's Foundation Football Hall of Fame in 2014.

During the team's existence, the players were paid $25 a week. The best known player on the team was Linda Jefferson who was named womenSports magazine's Athlete of the Year in 1975. She would become the first Black woman inducted into the Semi-Pro Football Hall of Fame. She’s also one of only four women in the American Association Football Hall of Fame.

Season-by-season

External links
 Perfect Season: The Untold Story of The Toledo Troopers
 Almost Undefeated: The Forgotten Football Upset of 1976
 The Ohio Women Who Dominated Professional Football
 The History of Women's Professional Football

References

1971 establishments in Ohio
1980 disestablishments in Ohio
Women's American football teams
American football teams established in 1971
American football teams in Ohio